Bernardo Álvarez Afonso (Breña Alta, island of La Palma, in the Province of Santa Cruz de Tenerife, July 29, 1949) is a Spanish Catholic bishop, since September 2005 twelfth bishop of the Roman Catholic Diocese of San Cristóbal de La Laguna (Tenerife) (Spanish: Diócesis Nivariense). 

On September 4, 2005 he was declared and credited bishop by Pope Benedict XVI, in the Iglesia de la Concepción (then provisional cathedral of the diocese, as the Cathedral of La Laguna was under renovation), the 12th bishop of the Diocese of Tenerife; on the same date he took canonical possession of the diocese. Álvarez is the second canary bishop in governing the diocese after Bishop Domingo Pérez Cáceres.

In a 2007 interview with local paper La Opinión de Tenerife, he stated "There are adolescents of thirteen years of age who are minors and are totally in agreement and furthermore desire it.  Even if you take care they provoke you." This led to a headline reading "Bishop of Tenerife blames child abuse on the children".

In 2014, it was able to reopen the Cathedral of La Laguna, after twelve years closed by a major restoration.

That same year 2014, the canonization of Blessed José de Anchieta by Pope Francis took place. On April 24, the Mass of thanksgiving for the canonization presided over by the Pope was celebrated in Rome and attended by Bishop Bernardo Álvarez accompanied by a Canarian representation. José de Anchieta born in Tenerife and missionary in Brazil, became the second canary to be canonized by the Catholic Church, after the Peter of Saint Joseph de Betancur in 2002.

On December 21, 2019, Álvarez opened the Holy Door of the Cathedral of San Cristóbal de La Laguna on the occasion of the Jubilee Year for the 200th anniversary of the founding of the diocese.

See also 
 Don Bernardo Álvarez Afonso. XII Obispo Nivariense

Notes

External links 
 Personal file in Catholic-hierarchy

1949 births
Living people
Roman Catholic bishops of San Cristóbal de La Laguna
21st-century Roman Catholic bishops in Spain